The Montana Avenue Historic District in El Paso, Texas is a historic district which was listed on the National Register of Historic Places in 2004. It included 69 contributing buildings: 51 houses, two churches, and 13 garages, as well as non-contributing buildings (mostly garages in the alley behind the houses).

It includes two-story brick Prairie Style, Classical Revival, and Queen Anne style works, including several designed by architect Henry C. Trost.

References

External links

National Register of Historic Places in El Paso County, Texas
Prairie School architecture in Texas
Queen Anne architecture in Texas
Neoclassical architecture in Texas